The 2016 Charlotte 49ers football team represented the University of North Carolina at Charlotte (also called Charlotte or UNC Charlotte) in the 2016 NCAA Division I FBS football season. It was the school's fourth season of NCAA football, their second season of NCAA Division I Football Bowl Subdivision (FBS) play, and their second season as a member of Conference USA's East Division. The team was led by fourth-year head coach Brad Lambert and played its home games on campus at Jerry Richardson Stadium in Charlotte, North Carolina. This was the first season the 49ers were eligible to participate in a bowl game. They finished the season 4–8, 3–5 in C-USA play to finish in fifth place in the East Division.

Previous season

The 49ers finished the season 4–8, 3–5 in C-USA play to finish in fifth place in the East Division.

Coaching staff
Former Eastern Kentucky head coach Dean Hood was announced as Assistant head coach and Tight Ends Coach on December 18, 2015. Lambert had worked with Hood at Wake Forest and had been his replacement as Defensive coordinator for the Demon Deacons. Johnson Richardson moved from coaching Tight Ends to Offensive Line Coach. After three years with the 49ers Napoleon Sykes returned to Navy to coach defensive line for the Midshipmen. NC State Quality Control Coach Ulrick Edmonds joined the staff of February 12, 2016. He replaced Sykes as Outside Linebackers Coach. After a one-year stint as Offensive Line Coach, having stepped into the role after the sudden death of Phil Ratliff, former Carolina Panther, Kevin Donnalley returned the Charlotte 49ers radio broadcast team.

Recruiting

Position key

Recruiting class

The following recruits and transfers have signed letters of intent to the Charlotte 49ers football program for the 2016 recruiting year.

Players

Player gameday honors

Roster

Awards and honors

Preseason

In Season

Post-season

Depth chart

Schedule

The game between Charlotte and Florida Atlantic scheduled for a 3:30 pm kickoff on October 8, 2016, was postponed due to the effects of Hurricane Matthew. The game was played the following day on October 9, 2016 with a noon kickoff.
Schedule Source:

Television

Charlotte 49ers home games and conference road games will be broadcast through Conference USA's television partners ESPN, CBS Sports, ASN, beIN, and Campus Insiders. Additional games will be available online through CUSA.tv.

Radio

Radio coverage for all games is broadcast by IMG College through the Charlotte 49ers Radio Network flagship station WFNZ 610 AM (102.5 FM) The Fan and the TuneIn Charlotte 49ers IMG Sports Network app. The radio announcers are "Voice of the 49ers" Matt Swierad with play-by-play, former Carolina Panther Kevin Donnalley with color commentary, and Bobby Rosinski with sideline reports. Swierad and Donnalley also host the "Gold Mine Live" Coaches Show each Monday during the season at noon from Norm's in the UNC Charlotte Student Union. "Gold Mine Live" can be heard on 1660 AM.

Preseason media poll
Conference USA released their preseason media poll on July 21, 2016, with the 49ers predicted to finish in last place in the East Division.

Game summaries

#19 Louisville Cardinals

Sources:

The 49ers faced their first ACC opponents when they met their former C-USA and Metro Conference foes.

Top performers for the game were Louisville quarterback Lamar Jackson, who passed for 286 yards and 6 touchdowns. Jackson also was the top rusher of the game, with 11 carries for 119 yards and 2 more touchdowns. Charlotte's Austin Duke had 5 receptions for 54 yards and a touchdown.

Game notes:

First ACC opponent for the 49ers.
First Nationally ranked FBS opponent.

Elon Phoenix

Sources:

The Phoenix were looking to spoil the 49ers' home opener, but Charlotte got revenge for their first loss of the 2014 season.

Top performers for the game were Charlotte quarterback Kevin Olsen, who passed for 155 yards and 3 touchdowns. Elon rusher Brandon Gentry had 9 carries for 56 yards and a touchdown. Charlotte's Austin Duke had 4 receptions for 103 yards and a touchdown.

Game notes:

Eastern Michigan Eagles

Sources:

The 49ers hosted their first opponents from the MAC when the Eagles visited Charlotte for the first time.

Top performers for the game were Eastern Michigan quarterback Todd Porter, who passed for 285 yards, 2 touchdowns, and 1 interception. Charlotte rusher Robert Washington had 20 carries for 120 yards. Eastern Michigan's Johnny Niupalau had 3 receptions for 72 yards and a touchdown.

Game notes:

First MAC opponent for the 49ers.

Temple Owls

Sources:

Charlotte visited the "City of Brotherly Love" for the first time hoping to return the favor to their former A10 conference mates for the drubbing they received at the hands of the Owls the previous season. Unfortunately it was more of the same for the 49ers.

Top performers for the game were Temple quarterback Phillip Walker, who passed for 268 yards and 2 touchdowns. Temple rusher Jahad Thomas had 15 carries for 68 yards and 2 touchdowns. Temple's Brodrick Yancey had 4 receptions for 70 yards and a touchdown.

Game notes:

First game for the 49ers in the State of Pennsylvania.

Old Dominion Monarchs

Sources:

The 49ers were looking to even the series up when the Monarchs visited Charlotte for the first time. Unfortunately the Niners would fall hard to a fired-up Monarchs squad for the first C-USA game of the season.

Top performers for the game were Old Dominion quarterback David Washington, who passed for 256 yards, 3 touchdowns, and 1 interception. ODU rusher Gemonta Jackson had 9 carries for 55 yards and a touchdown. ODU's Zach Pascal had 5 receptions for 68 yards and a touchdown.

Game notes:

Florida Atlantic Owls

Sources:

Charlotte visited Boca Raton for the first time looking to avenge a fourth quarter loss at home from the previous season. Not only did they accomplish that, but they also got their first conference win in program history after a controversial call reversal on a no time left Hail Mary ruled touchdown pass by FAU.

Top performers for the game were Charlotte quarterback Hasaan Klugh, who passed for 223 yards, 3 touchdowns, and 1 interception. FAU rusher Gregory Howell Jr. had 20 carries for 100 yards and 3 touchdowns. Charlotte's Austin Duke had 6 receptions for 111 yards and a touchdown.

Game notes:

 First Conference USA win in program history.
 Game delayed one day due to local effects of Hurricane Mathew.
 First Sunday game in program history.
 Austin Duke reached the 3000 yard career reception mark.
 Hasaan Klugh was named C-USA Co-Offensive Player of the Week.

FIU Panthers

Sources:

Charlotte was looking to even the series when the Panthers visited the Queen City for the first time. But a late score by FIU and a missed long range field goal would result in Charlotte's fourth lost Homecoming Game in a row.

Top performers for the game were FAU quarterback Alex McGough, who passed for 315 yards, 2 touchdowns, and 2 interceptions. Charlotte rusher Kalif Phillips had 24 carries for 99 yards. FAU's Thomas Owens had 11 receptions for 148 yards.

Game notes:

Larry Ogunjobi, the 49ers' all-Conference USA nose tackle had 4.5 tackles for a loss, including 1.5 sacks, and a team-best 10 tackles.

Marshall Thundering Herd

Sources:

Charlotte visited the State of West Virginia for the first time looking to avenge a loss at home from the previous season. Task accomplished, the 49ers even the series with Marshall and notched their second C-USA road win of the season.

Top performers for the game were Marshall quarterback Chase Litton, who passed for 262 yards, 2 touchdowns, and 1 interception. Charlotte rusher Kalif Phillips had 23 carries for 123 yards and 2 touchdowns. Marshall's Josh Knight had 10 receptions for 94 yards.

Game notes:

First game in the State of West Virginia.
Kalif Phillips, the 49ers' running back ran for 123 yards, his fourth 100-yard-plus performance this season.

Southern Miss Golden Eagles

Sources:

Charlotte visited the State of Mississippi for the first time looking to avenge a loss at home from the previous season. Charlotte dominated the game, becoming the first time in C-USA history to win on the road at Marshall and Southern Miss. in a single season.

Top performers for the game were Southern Miss. quarterback Nate Mullens, who passed for 249 yards, 2 touchdowns, and 2 interceptions. Charlotte rusher Kalif Phillips had 29 carries for 183 yards. Southern Miss's Chase Whitehead had 2 receptions for 84 yards and a touchdown.

Game notes:

First game in the State of Mississippi.
Coming off a 4-week injury, Terrence Winchester was named C-USA Defensive Player of the Week.
Juwan Foggie was named C-USA Special Teams Player of the Week.
First time Charlotte has won back-to-back FBS and conference games.

Rice Owls

Sources:

Charlotte pulled ahead for a three touchdown lead, but an anemic second half let Rice win the game off of quarterback Tyler Stehling's arms and legs.

Top performers for the game were Rice Stehling, who passed for 279 yards, a touchdown, and an interception. Stehling was also the top rusher of the game, with 20 carries for 93 yards and two touchdowns. Rice's Zach Wright had 12 receptions for 111 yards.

Game notes:

 Charlotte's second 1-point loss of the season.

Middle Tennessee Blue Raiders

Sources:

In Charlotte's first ever C-USA game the hosting Blue Raiders set new program records by pounding out a 42 to 7 first quarter on the thunderstruck 49ers. Charlotte was looking to return the favor when the Blue Raiders visited Charlotte for the first time. After a valiant late push to tie the game up late in the fourth quarter, Middle Tennessee would get the go ahead score and end the 49ers' chances of bowl eligibility.

Top performers for the game were Middle Tennessee quarterback John Urzua, who passed for 250 yards, 4 touchdowns, and 2 interceptions. Middle Tennessee rusher I'Tavius Mathers had 16 carries for 101 yards. Middle Tennessee's Richie James had 8 receptions for 89 yards and a touchdown.

Game notes:

Twenty-seven 49ers would participate in their final home collegiate game, including nineteen from Charlotte's very first recruiting class: Brandon Banks, Jarred Barr, Justin Bolus, Trent Bostick, Blake Brewer, Justin Bridges-Thompson, Zach Bumgardner, Devin Clegg, Nick Cook, Cameron Curlings, Jamal Covington, Kendrick Davis, Austin Duke, Tanner Fleming, Kyle Hoffman, Matt Johnson, Thomas La Bianca, Daquan Lucas, Lee McNeill, Stephen Muscarello, Cassy Perry, Hayden Pezzoni, Kalif Phillips, Larry Ogunjobi, E.J. Rhinehart, Keaston Sinicki, Bradan Smith, Terrance Winchester.

UTSA Roadrunners

Sources:

The final home game of the 2015 season for Charlotte went down to the wire with the Roadrunners pulling out an overtime victory. Charlotte was looking to return the favor as they visited San Antonio for the first time. The game was controlled by the Roadrunners until Charlotte got within a touchdown score; but the Roadrunners would pull away late to clinch their spot in a bowl game, and end the 49ers' season with a loss.

Top performers for the game were UT San Antonio quarterback Dalton Strum, who passed for 146 yards and a touchdown. UT San Antonio rusher Jarveon Williams had 19 carries for 48 yards. UTSA's Kerry Thomas Jr. had 5 receptions for 145 yards and a touchdown.

Game notes:

Matt Johnson would finish his collegiate career with 5,405 passing yards to become to the 49ers' all-time leading passer, with an additional 1,273 rushing yards to his credit.
Kalif Phillips would finish his collegiate career with 4,020 rushing yards, and 41 rushing touchdowns (43 overall) becoming the 49ers' all-time rushing leader and scorer.
Austin Duke would finish his collegiate career with his 4th 100 yard game of the season and his 13th 100 yard game overall.
Duke would also finish his collegiate career with 3,437 receiving yards, becoming the 49ers' career leader in receptions and 24 receiving touchdowns (25 overall). He is the 49ers' #2 all-time leading scorer behind Phillips.
Larry Ogunjobi would finish his collegiate career with 49 tackles for losses, 13 sacks, and 217 tackles to become the 49ers' all-time leader in each category. He also started all 46 games in program history. 
Ogunjobi was selected to participate in the 2017 Senior Bowl.

Attendance

Players drafted into the NFL

References

Charlotte
Charlotte 49ers football seasons
Charlotte 49ers football